The Ministers and Secretaries Acts 1924 to 2020 is the legislation which governs the appointment of ministers to the Government of Ireland and the allocation of functions between departments of state. It is subject in particular to the provisions of Article 28 of the Constitution of Ireland. The Acts allow for the appointment of between 7 and 15 Ministers of Government across 17 Departments, and for the appointment of up to 20 junior ministers, titled Ministers of State, to assist the Ministers of Government in their powers and duties.

The principal act is the Ministers and Secretaries Act 1924 and was one of the key statutes enacted by the Irish Free State. The Constitution of the Irish Free State in 1922 had provided for the formation of a cabinet called the Executive Council. The 1924 Act formally defined the government departments that were to exist in the Free State, created their titles and outlined their responsibilities. The Act has been amended and affected by subsequent legislation which may be cited together and construed as one Act. The names and functions of departments have changed frequently by secondary legislation. Although the secretaries created by the 1924 Act were later replaced by ministers of state, as amendments to the principal Act, subsequent legislation changing the structures of government departments have continued to use the title Ministers and Secretaries Act.

Background

Lord Lieutenant's administration
From 1801 to 1922, Ireland had been governed as part of the United Kingdom. The legal government of Ireland was an executive and Privy Council of Ireland under the British Lord Lieutenant of Ireland; in practice, the Dublin Castle administration was run by the Chief Secretary for Ireland.

Irish Republic and the Anglo-Irish Treaty
After the 1918 general election, MPs elected for Sinn Féin established the extrajudicial Dáil Éireann (House of Assembly) in January 1919 and made a unilateral declaration of independence of the Irish Republic. This operated without external recognition under the terms of the Dáil Constitution. Its executive, the Ministry of Dáil Éireann, was headed by the President of Dáil Éireann. In January 1922, a majority of the Dáil accepted the terms of the Anglo-Irish Treaty which agreed the terms of the independence of the Irish Free State from the United Kingdom.

In January 1922, a Provisional Government of Ireland was formed, approved by the members elected for the House of Commons of Southern Ireland in accordance with the provisions of the Treaty. By Order in Council under the Irish Free State (Agreement) Act 1922, the British Government formally transferred powers to the Provisional Government on 1 April 1922.

Constitution of the Irish Free State
ON 6 December 1922, under the Treaty's provisions, the new Constitution of the Irish Free State, having been enacted separately by the Third Dáil, sitting as a constituent assembly, and the Parliament of the United Kingdom, came into force through a proclamation issued by the King. Both the Dáil Ministry and the Provisional Government were replaced by the Executive Council, under the chairmanship of the President of the Executive Council. Initially its governmental offices were an amalgam of posts from the Lord Lieutenant's administration, the Provisional Government and the Dáil Ministry. For example, there was an Irish Postmaster General, a post that had existed in the Lord Lieutenant's administration, and a Minister for Home Affairs, an office created as part of the Dáil ministry.

New legislation
In the Governor-General's Address to Dáil Éireann at the State Opening of the Oireachtas on 3 October 1923 the first indication was given that:

The Ministers and Secretaries Bill 1923 was introduced by William T. Cosgrave, President of the Executive Council, on 16 November 1923. The governmental structures that were to be a permanent feature of independent Irish government were regularised and defined. Positions which had existed under the Dublin Castle administration, like those of Postmaster-General and Solicitor-General, were merged into new Departments of State, as was the Ministry for Labour, which had been part of the Dáil Ministry. Some positions which had been created by the Dáil Ministry were given new names, such as the Minister for Home Affairs, which became the Minister for Justice. The bill was enacted as the Ministers and Secretaries Act 1924, and was commenced on 2 June 1924.

Departments of State
The 1924 Act created the following government departments:

Notes

Ten of the eleven departments created in 1924 continue to exist, with changes in most cases to departmental title and functions. Section 6 of the Ministers and Secretaries (Amendment) Act 1939 permits the Government to alter the title of any department of state or minister and to transfer branches between departments.

Departments created post-1924
The following departments were created by later amending legislation:

Ministers of State
Section 7 of the 1924 Act permitted the Executive Council to appoint up to seven members of the Oireachtas as parliamentary secretaries to the Executive Council or to Executive Ministers.

The Ministers and Secretaries (Amendment) (No. 2) Act 1977 abolished the position of parliamentary secretary. In its place, it permitted the government to appoint up to ten members of the Oireachtas (Dáil or Seanad) to the position of Minister of State, a ministerial position of non-cabinet rank attached to one or more of the Departments of State. These changes took effect on 1 January 1978. In June 2020 Pippa Hackett became the first senator appointed as a Minister of State. Unlike government ministers who are appointed by the President on the advice of the Taoiseach with the prior approval of the Dáil, Ministers of State are appointed by the cabinet, on nomination of the Taoiseach.

Ministers of State continue in office after the dissolution of the Dáil until a successor is appointed. If the Taoiseach resigns from office, a Minister of State is also deemed to have resigned from office. A Minister of State ceases to hold office if they are appointed as a Government Minister. A Minister of State may resign from office by letter addressed to the Taoiseach.

Powers and duties of a Government Minister may be delegated to a Minister of State by a statutory instrument. If the Government Minister resigns, these powers must delegated again on the appointment of a new Government Minister.

In 1980, the number of Ministers of State permitted was increased from 10 to 15; in 1995 it was raised to 17; and in 2007 it was raised to 20.

Other provisions of the Acts
Section 3(2) of the 1924 Act (later repealed and replaced in similar terms by s. 4 of the Ministers and Secretaries (Amendment) Act 1946) allowed for two or more Departments of State to be assigned to the same member of Government. At present, Simon Coveney is Minister for Foreign Affairs and Minister for Defence, Eamon Ryan is Minister for the Environment, Climate and Communications and Minister for Transport, and Heather Humphreys is Minister for Social Protection and Minister for Rural and Community Development.

Section 6 of the 1924 Act created the post of Attorney-General of the Irish Free State. This post was to take over, "the business, powers, authorities, duties and functions formerly vested in or exercised by the Attorney-General for Ireland, the Solicitor-General for Ireland, the Attorney-General for Southern Ireland, the Solicitor-General for Southern Ireland, the Law Adviser to the Lord Lieutenant of Ireland and any or all of them respectively…".

The 1924 Act also created an official Seal for the Executive Council, and created a Council for Defence to aid and advise the Minister for Defence.

The 1939 Act allowed a member of the Government to be a minister without portfolio, not being assigned to a Department of State, but to be given a specific style or title. This was the case for Frank Aiken, who was Minister for the Co-ordination of Defensive Measures from 1939 to 1945. It is also the case for members of the government who are named to head a government department which is being created under an amendment to the Ministers and Secretaries Acts.

The 1939 Act also permitted the Taoiseach to perform a cabinet reshuffle.

See also
Irish cabinets since 1919

References

External links
 Text of the Principal Act
 Oireachtas debates on the Ministers and Secretaries Bill 1923 (Bill 51 of 1923)

1924 in Irish law
Acts of the Oireachtas of the 1920s